The 1972 Winter Olympic Games cross-country skiing results.

Medal summary

Medal table

Men's events

Women's events

Participating NOCs
Nineteen nations participated in Cross-country skiing at the 1972 Games.

References

External links
Official Olympic Report

 
1972 Winter Olympics
1972 Winter Olympics events
Olympics
Cross-country skiing competitions in Japan